The 1955 Dartmouth Indians football team was an American football team that represented Dartmouth College as an independent during the 1955 college football season. In their first season under head coach Bob Blackman, the Indians compiled a 3–6 record, and were outscored 120 to 92. Leo McKennawas the team captain.

This would be Dartmouth's final year as a football independent, as the Ivy League, which Dartmouth had helped co-found in 1954, began football competition in 1956. Six of the nine opponents on the Indians' 1955 schedule were Ivy League members (with Penn the only Ivy not scheduled); for decades, (future) Ivy members had comprised a large portion of Dartmouth's opponents.

Dartmouth played its home games at Memorial Field on the college campus in Hanover, New Hampshire.

Schedule

References

Dartmouth
Dartmouth Big Green football seasons
Dartmouth Indians football